Parocyusa is a genus of beetles belonging to the family Staphylinidae.

The species of this genus are found in Europe and Northern America.

Species:
 Parocyusa americana (Casey, 1906)

References

Staphylinidae
Staphylinidae genera